The 1996 Tulane Green Wave football team was an American football team that represented Tulane University during the 1996 NCAA Division I-A football season as a member of Conference USA. In their fifth year under head coach Buddy Teevens, the team compiled an overall record of 1–9, with a mark of 1–4 in conference play, placing sixth in C-USA.

Schedule

Roster

References

Tulane
Tulane Green Wave football seasons
Tulane Green Wave football